The 2016–17 Notre Dame Fighting Irish men's basketball team represented the University of Notre Dame during the 2016–17 NCAA Division I men's basketball season. The Fighting Irish, led by 17th-year head coach Mike Brey, played their home games at Edmund P. Joyce Center in South Bend, Indiana as fourth-year members of the Atlantic Coast Conference. They finished the season 26–10, 12–6 in ACC play to finish in a three-way tie for second place. They defeated Virginia and Florida State to advance to the championship game of the ACC tournament where they lost to Duke. They received an at-large bid to the NCAA tournament as the No. 5 seed in the West Region. There they defeated No. 12 seed Princeton in the First Round before losing in the Second Round where they lost to No. 4 seed West Virginia.

Previous season
The Fighting Irish finished the 2015–16 season 24–12, 11–7 in ACC play to finish in a tie for fifth place. They defeated Duke in the quarterfinals of the ACC tournament before losing in the semifinals to North Carolina. They received an at-large bid to the NCAA tournament where they defeated Michigan, Stephen F. Austin, and Wisconsin to advance to the Elite Eight. There they lost to fellow ACC member North Carolina.

Offseason

Departures

2016 recruiting class

2017 Recruiting class

Roster

Schedule and results

|-
!colspan=12 style=| Exhibition

|-
!colspan=12 style=| Non-conference regular season

|-
!colspan=12 style=| ACC Regular season

|-
!colspan=12 style=| ACC Tournament

|-
!colspan=12 style=| NCAA tournament

Rankings

*AP does not release post-NCAA tournament rankings

References

Notre Dame Fighting Irish men's basketball seasons
Notre Dame
Notre Dame Fighting Irish men's basketball
Notre Dame Fighting Irish men's basketball
Notre Dame